Algibacter mikhailovii is a Gram-negative, heterotrophic and motile bacterium from the genus of Algibacter.

References

Flavobacteria
Bacteria described in 2007